is a Japanese professional baseball pitcher for the  in the Japan Women’s Baseball League. She is also a starting pitcher for the Japan women’s national baseball team, which she has led to five World Cup medals.

Sato is considered by many to be the best female pitcher, and by some the best female baseball player, in the world. She can throw close to 80 miles an hour. Her curveball was clocked at 2,583 revolutions per minute. Sato has won five gold medals for her home country. She is the only women's baseball player to have won three consecutive MVP awards.

Early life 
Sato attended Kamimura Garkuen High School in Ichikikushikino, Kagoshima, Japan. She then attended Shobi University in Kawagoe, Saitama, Japan where she played on her college women’s baseball team.

Sato found her love of baseball through playing catch with her brother at age 9. At the time, there was no women’s team in Japan. "I played against boys, and then I wanted to be them," Sato emphasized through a translator.  She credits an elementary teacher for showing her how to throw a slider and a curveball. 

Sato was drawn to the control and constant action of being a pitcher. "I love to pitch because the pitcher is in the spotlight," Sato said. "I like being in control."

As a high school player, Sato claims she was nothing particularly special. However, in college she connected with a wise pitching coach who showed her how to let go and just have fun. "It broadened my mind more and more" she said. "And I learned how to enjoy it."

Her family was supportive when she decided to become a professional pitcher. Sato left home when she was in high school, "so after[wards] ... there was a little distance between the family and [myself]." But her parents would follow along with Sato's career through the media — she played on her college women's team, and joined the Japan Women's League after it was founded in 2009 — and they continue to be "very supportive."

Sato considered giving up on her dream of becoming a professional baseball player many times. There weren't many opportunities for young women who wanted to pursue a career in baseball. However, the Japan's Women's Baseball League was founded in 2009, just in time for Sato to begin her career.

Professional career

Women's National World Cup 
In 2010, at the age of 20, Sato debuted in the 2010 Women’s Baseball World Cup (WBWC), going 3-0 with a 0.53 ERA, beating Puerto Rico and shutting out Venezuela. She then went on to beat USA, only allowing two hits and no walks, and in effect eliminating them from a shot at the gold. Japan won the title that year, and Sato was named the Cup All-Star starting pitcher.

In the 2012 WBWC, Sato was 1-0 with a 0.72 ERA. The Japanese team was undefeated in that tournament and they won their third straight gold medal.

During the 2014 WBWC she led with two wins and a 0.00 ERA, pitching 12 innings and 10 strikeouts. She pitched in the gold medal game against USA and out dueled Sarah Hudek. She led her team to a third straight gold medal and received her first MVP award for her dominant performance.

In the 2016 WBWC, she had another dominant performance. She led with 21 strikeouts, had a 3-0 record and a 1.33 ERA. She was the starting pitcher in the championship game against Canada, pitching a two-hit, one-walk shutout. She received a second MVP award in a row and was also named All-Star starter.

In 2018, Sato won her third straight MVP award in the 2018 WBWC and led Japan to their sixth straight world cup. With that win, she extended Japan's tournament win streak to 30 games. In the championship game against USA, Sato pitched a complete game with only 88 pitches to secure the 21 outs needed. She never allowed a USA hitter to reach third base and was one hit short of a no-hitter. Japan won the game with a score of 3-0. 

Since Sato’s debut in 2010, the Japan women's national baseball team has won five world cup medals.

Japan Women's Baseball League 
She had a record of 6-10 with a 2.23 ERA in 29 starts. She led the league with 62 strikeouts as a rookie.

She was 11-9 with a save for North Reia in 2014 and led the loop with 66 whiffs. In 2015, she posted a 9-9, 2.43 record when moving to  after North Reia became a development team. During 2016, she improved to 9-3, 2.17, leading the league in wins and ERA.

Sato led the league in strikeouts three out of the last four seasons, in wins for the past two, and has a 2.31 ERA over that period. 

Sato played her sixth year as a professional baseball player with Aichi Dione in 2018.

References 

Japanese female baseball players
People from the Amami Islands
1989 births
Living people